In zoology, mammalogy is the study of mammals – a class of vertebrates with characteristics such as homeothermic metabolism, fur, four-chambered hearts, and complex nervous systems. Mammalogy has also been known as "mastology," "theriology," and "therology." The archive of number of mammals on earth is constantly growing, but is currently set at 6,495 different mammal species including recently extinct. There are 5,416 living mammals identified on earth and roughly 1,251 have been newly discovered since 2006.  The major branches of mammalogy include natural history, taxonomy and systematics, anatomy and physiology, ethology, ecology, and management and control. The approximate salary of a mammalogist varies from $20,000 to $60,000 a year, depending on their experience.  Mammalogists are typically involved in activities such as conducting research, managing personnel, and writing proposals.

Mammalogy branches off into other taxonomically-oriented disciplines such as primatology (study of primates), and cetology (study of cetaceans). Like other studies, mammalogy is also a part of zoology which is also a part of biology, the study of all living things.

Research purposes 
Mammalogists have stated that there are multiple reasons for the study and observation of mammals. Knowing how mammals contribute or thrive in their ecosystems gives knowledge on the ecology behind it. Mammals are often used in business industries, agriculture, and kept for pets. Studying mammals habitats and source of energy has led to aiding in survival. The domestication of some small mammals has also helped discover several different diseases, viruses, and cures.

Mammalogist 
A mammalogist studies and observes mammals. In studying mammals, they can observe their habitats, contributions to the ecosystem, their interactions, and the anatomy and physiology. A mammalogist can do a broad variety of things within the realm of mammals. A mammalogist on average can make roughly $58,000 a year. This depends on employer and state.

History 
The first people recorded to have researched mammals were the ancient Greeks with records on mammals that were not even native to Greece and others that were. Aristotle was one of the first to recognize whales and dolphins as mammals since up until the 18th century most of the study was done by taxonomy.

Journals 

This is a list of scientific journals broadly serving mammalogists. In addition, many other more general zoology, ecology and evolution, or conservation journals also deal with mammals, and several journals are specific to only certain taxonomic groups of mammals.

See also 
 List of mammalogists

References

External links
 Mammal Research Institute, University of Pretoria, South Africa
 The American Society of Mammalogists

 
Subfields of zoology